Max Rockatansky is the title character and antihero protagonist of the Australian post-apocalyptic action film series Mad Max. Created by director George Miller and producer Byron Kennedy, the character was originally played by actor Mel Gibson in the first three films from 1979 to 1985, and later Tom Hardy in the fourth in 2015.

Films

Mad Max

In Mad Max, Max Rockatansky is a Main Force Patrol officer tasked with maintaining law and order on the roads of a dystopian Victoria, Australia. Max is quiet, rarely speaking to any great extent, and never paying much attention to his steadily increasing reputation. He and his wife, Jessie, have an infant son, referred to only as "Sprog" (slang for "child") in the film.

Though the best officer on the force, he is secretly afraid that he is becoming as cold and heartless as the criminals he pursues. He reaches a breaking point when a gang of criminally insane bikers led by the Toecutter burn Max's partner Goose alive inside a borrowed ute. The sight of Goose's charred body in a hospital bed prompts Max to tender his resignation from the MFP. However, he is convinced by his commanding officer to take a vacation before committing to his decision. Max goes on holiday with his family, but this leads to a chain of events that ultimately results in the Toecutter's gang killing Jessie and Sprog. Overwhelmed with grief and rage, he goes AWOL from the MFP, steals their Pursuit Special ("the last of the V8 Interceptors") and systematically pursues and kills each gang member responsible. Max is injured in an ambush set for him by the Toecutter, where he is shot in the left leg and has his right arm run over at the elbow. Despite his injuries, he manages to fatally shoot gang lieutenant Bubba Zanetti and pursues the Toecutter to his death. After hunting down final gang member Johnny the Boy and leaving him in a death trap, Max drives out into the wasteland, leaving the fading remnants of civilization behind him.

Mad Max 2

In this film, set about three years after the first film, Max, while wandering the wasteland of the outback in his new home, the battle scarred Pursuit Special, discovers a besieged group of people manning a remote oil drilling station and refinery. After losing nearly all of his remaining worldly possessions, including his dog and his car, Max, with few options left, agrees to help the refinery's denizens to escape through hordes of marauding motorcycle gang members and their leader Humungus. In this film, although Max has lost everything, he is able to find, at least in part, his humanity once again. However, he still cannot form any significant bonds with others and chooses to continue wandering the wasteland alone.

Mad Max Beyond Thunderdome

In this installment of the Mad Max series, it has been eighteen years since Max Rockatansky left his life behind him following his revenge killings of the Toecutter and his gang, and fifteen years after his defeat of the Humungus. Since that time he has wandered through the outback, scavenging whatever he needed for survival. His hair has grown long, and very few remnants of his old police uniform remain recognizable. After falling foul of Aunty Entity, the dictatorial leader of the settlement of Bartertown, Max is exiled into the desert. He stumbles across and is rescued by a tribe of children living in a wilderness oasis, the descendants of survivors of a crashed airliner, becoming their saviour and protector against the vicious world outside. In this movie, Max is able to come full circle, regaining his humanity and soul once again, and sacrificing his own well-being for the sake of others.

Mad Max: Fury Road

Sometime after Mad Max Beyond Thunderdome, the opening to Fury Road finds Max haggard and alone with his car. After his Interceptor is wrecked and he is captured by a gang known as the "War Boys", he is imprisoned and used as a live blood donor for the gang. Strapped to the hood of a car in pursuit of the War Boys' renegade general, Imperator Furiosa, Max escapes and reluctantly helps Furiosa in her quest to help five women escape from the War Boys' despotic leader, Immortan Joe. After the group defeat their pursuers, Max parts ways with the survivors of the group and disappears.

Games

Mad Max (1990)

The first video game to feature the character was released in 1990 for the Nintendo Entertainment System. The game's plot is loosely based on Mad Max 2.

Mad Max (2015)

Max's journey to the Plains of Silence takes an unexpected turn when a group of War Boys run him off the road and steal his clothes, his supplies, his weapons, and his car before leaving him to rot in the desert sun. Traversing the wasteland in search of his prized Interceptor, Max meets a hunchbacked mechanic named Chumbucket, an overzealous individual that's hell-bent on crafting the perfect vehicle, the Magnum Opus. After giving Max hope of exacting vengeance on Scrotus, the two form an unlikely partnership and set out in the base of the Opus in search of food, water, allies, upgrades, and redemption in a world devoid of sanity.

Equipment
During the first two films, Max makes use of a Pursuit Special, though he drives a different vehicle (an MFP Interceptor) earlier in the first film. Between the second and third films, after the destruction of the Pursuit Special, Max acquires a roll-cage equipped vehicle based on a pick-up truck and set up to be used as a camel-drawn wagon at need. This is later stolen from him. He later steals it back after it has been modified to run on methane and uses it during the final chase sequence.

He wears the black MFP issue uniform of heavy duty riding leathers, which become ripped and patched through the course of the series. During his time with Main Force Patrol, he is armed with a revolver which he does not use, favouring a sawn-off shotgun which he uses in the second and third films. In the third film, he uses a more traditional shotgun, and, after accumulating even more weapons, surrenders them all in Bartertown, which The Scotsman calls a moment of self-parody.

Abilities

Max possesses considerable skill with firearms and is an excellent shot, but his most apparent skill is combative driving: he can shoot accurately with one hand while driving with the other. At the time of Mad Max, he was considered the "top pursuit man" in the MFP. He can easily pursue or evade gangs in the wasteland, whether overrunning another vehicle at high speed or ramming vehicles off the road. This skill is apparent with trucks as well as automobiles, as he drives a semi truck after sustaining serious injuries in the second film.

Max displays fast reflexes in Mad Max 2: The Road Warrior by grabbing a snake before it can bite him and in Mad Max: Fury Road stomping a two-headed lizard that runs towards him from behind. This leads Aunty Entity to choose him to kill Master Blaster in Mad Max Beyond Thunderdome, as he was the first to survive her "audition." Max also displays a fair amount of mechanical and electronics ability, performing minor repairs on his own vehicle and rigging two to explode should someone tamper with them or his fuel tanks. He also improvised a time delay fuse with only a cigarette lighter, a lamp housing and the leaking fuel of an overturned vehicle.

Max is primarily a survivalist in the wasteland and can tolerate discomfort and pain in achieving a goal, but unlike many movie protagonists, Max is susceptible to realistic and sometimes permanent injury: his left knee is blown out by a gunshot towards the end of the first film, he walks with a slight limp with the help of a leg brace in the second film, and the knee is still tightly bandaged in the third film. In Fury Road, Max's left knee brace makes another appearance and still appears to affect his mobility, albeit only slightly. An injury to his left eye as a result of the crash of the Pursuit Special in Mad Max 2: The Road Warrior is evident years later in Mad Max Beyond Thunderdome.

Reception
Entertainment Weekly ranked the character eleventh on its list of the top twenty "All-Time Coolest Heroes in Pop Culture" in April 2009. The magazine also listed the characters portrayed by Kevin Costner in Waterworld and The Postman as "copycat descendants" of Max Rockatansky. Total Film ranked him #75 in their Top 100 Movie Characters of All Time.

References

Mad Max (franchise) characters
Film characters introduced in 1979
Fictional survivalists
Fictional mercenaries
Fictional Australian police officers
Fictional police officers in films
Fictional vigilantes
Fictional drivers
Fictional characters with post-traumatic stress disorder
Male characters in film